John Higley Case (April 15, 1832 – March 3, 1890) was an American politician.

Case was born in Torrington, Connecticut, April 15, 1832, and entered Yale College from Granby, Connecticut, whither his father, Dr. Jarrus Case, removed in his infancy. For a year after graduation in 1855 he was at home, engaged in agriculture and the study of law. In September, 1856, he entered the Yale Law School, where he studied for a year. In 1858 he established himself in the practice of law in Faribault, Minnesota, where he was successful in his profession. He was elected District Attorney in 1864 for a term of two years; and in 1870 was chosen Minnesota State Senator.  He died in Faribault, March 3, 1890, in his 58th year.  He married December 1, 1875, Anna Buike, of Faribault, who survived him without children.

External links

1832 births
1890 deaths
Yale Law School alumni
People from Torrington, Connecticut
Minnesota state senators
Minnesota lawyers
19th-century American politicians
Yale College alumni
19th-century American lawyers